Hispanic Monarchy and Spanish Monarchy may refer to
the Monarchy of Spain 
the early modern monarchy of the Spanish Habsburgs in the Iberian peninsula and around the globe
Habsburg Spain
Iberian Union
the early modern Spanish Empire in general

es:Monarquía Hispánica